Dharmaram may refer to:

Pragathi Dharmaram also earlier called as D. Dharmaram is a village in Ramayampet mandal of Medak District of Telangana
Dharmaram College, seminary in Bangalore, commonly known only as 'Dharamaran'
Dharmaram, Peddapalli district in Peddapalli district, Andhra Pradesh

See also